Jacksonville Township is one of twelve townships in Chickasaw County, Iowa, USA.  As of the 2000 census, its population was 504.

History
Jacksonville Township was organized in 1858.

Geography
According to the USGS, it contains six cemeteries: Immanuel Lutheran, Jacksonville, Jerico Lutheran, Saint Patricks Catholic, Sargeant Farm and Yankee.

References

 USGS Geographic Names Information System (GNIS)

External links
 US-Counties.com
 City-Data.com

Townships in Chickasaw County, Iowa
Townships in Iowa